Friesenheim is a commune in the Bas-Rhin department in Grand Est in north-eastern France.

Economy
Friesenheim retains a strongly agricultural economy.  The sight of old drying racks for tobacco leaves brings to mind just one of the many crops that flourish in the gently warm climate of the alluvial riverside fields surrounding the village.

See also
 Communes of the Bas-Rhin department

References

Communes of Bas-Rhin
Bas-Rhin communes articles needing translation from French Wikipedia